The Tour de Lozari is a ruined Genoese tower located in the commune of Belgodère on the west coast of the French island of Corsica. Only the base of the tower has survived. It sits on the headland at a height of  overlooking the sea.

The tower was one of a series of coastal defences constructed by the Republic of Genoa between 1530 and 1620 to stem the attacks by Barbary pirates.

The Conservatoire du littoral, a French government agency responsible for the protection of outstanding natural areas on the coast, has announced that it intends to purchase the  headland and adjacent coastline. As of 2017 it had acquired .

See also
List of Genoese towers in Corsica

References

Towers in Corsica